Graham Street is a street in Hong Kong and the location of Graham Street Market, one of the oldest continuously operating street markets in Hong Kong.

Location
Located in Central, Hong Kong Island, the street starts from Queen's Road Central and runs uphill and south to Staunton Street, crossing Stanley Street, Wellington Street, Gage Street, Lyndhurst Terrace and Hollywood Road. The Street Market occupies the section between Queen's Road Central and Hollywood Road.

History
The market dates back more than 160 years. The street is narrow but allows a row of stalls on either sides and sells various foodstuff.

One of the earliest cinemas in Hong Kong, the Bijou Theatre (比照戲院), opened in Graham Street in 1907.

Queen Elizabeth II, accompanied by Governor Murray MacLehose, visited the Graham Street market on 5 May 1975 to speak with locals.

Graham Street was featured in a scene from the 2001 film Rush Hour 2.

The Urban Renewal Authority is redeveloping Graham Street and Peel Street and planning to demolish the market. This will affect over 37 buildings in the process.

References

External links

 HK magazine: "Marked for Death", July 20th, 2007
 HK magazine: "Market Raiders", September 14th, 2007
 HK magazine: "Market Values", February 1st, 2008
 
 

Roads on Hong Kong Island
Street markets in Hong Kong
Central, Hong Kong